El radar was a Colombian current affairs programme broadcast on weeknights at 23:00 on Caracol TV.

It was presented in April 2008 by Jorge Alfredo Vargas or its director Darío Fernando Patiño (before that its presenter was  D'Arcy Quinn. Most episodes feature one, two, or three interviews with politicians, analysts, artists, businesspeople, etc. The interviewers are well-known Colombian journalists from radio, television, and print media.

Twice a week the comical duo Tola y Maruja appear to mock Colombian politics and society. Its section on El radar was nominated for the India Catalina award (part of the Cartagena Film Festival) for Best Journalism and/or Opinion Programme in 2008.

On early 2009, its Monday time slot was filled with repeats of Séptimo día. During some weeks in May and June 2009 it was moved to 23:30 to make room for the Telemundo telenovela La novela basada en Sin tetas no hay paraíso, but after complaints from the viewers (and jokes by Tola y Maruja during the programme), it was returned to its initial time slot.

Regular interviewers
Paulo Laserna Phillips
Camilo Durán
Daniel Samper Ospina
Ernesto McCausland
Darío Arizmendi
María Emma Mejía
José Gabriel Ortiz
Paola Ochoa
Félix de Bedout
Javier Hernández Bonnet
María Elvira Samper
Yamid Amat Serna
Gustavo Gómez
Manuel Teodoro
Gustavo Duncan
Felipe Zuleta
Beatriz Gómez
Antonio Morales

Footnotes

External links 
 Official site

Colombian television news shows
2008 Colombian television series debuts
2011 Colombian television series endings
2000s Colombian television series
2010s Colombian television series
Caracol Televisión original programming